The Micronesian megapode or Micronesian scrubfowl (Megapodius laperouse) is an endangered megapode which inhabits islands of the Western Pacific Ocean.

Description
The Micronesian megapode is a stocky medium-sized bird that is mostly dark brownish-black in appearance. Its head is paler than its body, and it has a pale grey crest, a yellow bill, and large dull-yellow legs and feet.

It is 38 cm. Medium-sized, dark megapode with paler head. Mostly brownish-black with short pale grey crest. Yellow bill, red facial skin showing through thin feathers. Unusually large, dingy yellow legs and feet. Similar spp. Could be confused with dark morphs of Red Junglefowl Gallus gallus (or feral domestic stock). .

Its call is a loud "keek", song often a duet with one bird beginning a rising and accelerating "keek-keek-keek-keek"- etc. culminating in a loud "kee-keer-kew" (Palau) or "keek-keer-keet" (Marianas), the other answering with a rising cackle that slows near the end. .

The Micronesian scrubfowl (Megapodius laperouse) is named after the French explorer Jean-François de Galaup, comte de Lapérouse.

Habitat
The bird is still to be found in the Marianas.  It was previously recorded on the islands of Asuncion, Agrihan, Pagan, Aguijan and Alamagan. A remnant population of a few birds may persist on Saipan and Tinian, and it is extinct on Rota and Guam.  Small groups of the birds frequent the thickets and scrublands of low outlying islands in the region; however, when present on larger islands, they may also be found inland on higher ground.

Its habitat is thick forest and it is omnivorous, eating a large variety of foods from the forest floor.

Behavior
Often shy and secretive, but becomes relatively tame on inhabited islands where protected from disturbance. Visits nesting mounds several times a day. The birds are known to creep around in the shadows of small trees and are not capable of flying for long distances. However they are accomplished runners and would be very hard to catch.

The Micronesian scrubfowl and some other megapodes are the only birds known to incubate their eggs using volcanic heat.

Breeding
During the breeding season, just after the southeast monsoon comes in, the females make large mounds of debris in which to lay their eggs.  Some individual females will lay their eggs together in the same mound.  However the females do not use the same mound more than once and are swapped with different females.  When the eggs hatch after one to two months later, the chicks will feed on grass shoots and insects.

Conservation
The species is currently classified as endangered because it has a very small range, restricted to isolated undisturbed offshore islets. Megapodius laperouse occurs on Palau and the Northern Mariana Islands (to USA), and is extirpated from Guam (to USA)

The introduction of dogs, cats, pigs, and rats is believed to have led to the decline of this species throughout most of the islands. Along with increased predation, during the Japanese occupation of the islands of Saipan and Tinian, most of the vegetation of both islands was burnt and replaced by large sugar cane farms.

It is estimated that only 2000–2500 of the species remain. It can be found in the island nation of Palau, and undisturbed islands of the Northern Marianas chain, with several hundred on Sarigan. Reportedly, a small population has recently been reintroduced on Saipan.

The bird appears on the 2010 IUCN Red List Category (as evaluated by BirdLife International - the official Red List Authority for birds for IUCN). The species qualifies as "Endangered" because it has a very small range, restricted to isolated undisturbed offshore islets, with few birds elsewhere. Given the multiple threats across its range, it is likely to be suffering from a continuing decline.

It seems that the only way for the species to be safe is to protect a few small islands and release a small population of megapodes there. That way, a safe population is secured. On the larger and higher islands, an increase of people and introduced pests will sooner or later destroy any megapode populations.

Subspecies
The Marianas Island megapode or Megapodius laperouse laperouse is the nominate subspecies of the Micronesian megapode found in the Mariana Islands. It is rare, localised and in danger of disappearing.

References

 Greenway, James C. 1967. Extinct and Vanishing Birds (2nd ed). New York City: Dover Publications.

External links
 BirdLife Species Factsheet.

Micronesian megapode
Birds of Micronesia
Micronesian megapode
ESA endangered species